Salisbury is a village about  north west of Dungog, in New South Wales, Australia.

References

Suburbs of Dungog Shire